Robert A. Innes (23 July 1878 – 1959) was a Scottish professional footballer of the early twentieth century.  Born in Lanark, he played for Notts County and Nottingham Forest between 1901 and 1905, and made a total of 71 appearances in the English Football League.

References

1878 births
1959 deaths
Scottish footballers
Sportspeople from Lanark
Gillingham F.C. players
Nottingham Forest F.C. players
Notts County F.C. players
Swindon Town F.C. players
Brighton & Hove Albion F.C. players
Scottish football managers
St Bernard's F.C. managers
Scottish Football League managers
Association footballers not categorized by position
English Football League players
Footballers from South Lanarkshire